Zhao Yongsheng (born April 16, 1970 in Jinzhou, Liaoning) is a retired male race walker from PR China. He competed for his native country at the 1996 Summer Olympics.

Achievements

External links
 

1970 births
Living people
Athletes (track and field) at the 1996 Summer Olympics
Chinese male racewalkers
Olympic athletes of China
People from Jinzhou
Athletes from Liaoning
World Athletics Race Walking Team Championships winners